The Bayerische Staatsbrauerei Weihenstephan (Bavarian State Brewery of Weihenstephan) is a German brewery located on the site of the former Weihenstephan Abbey in Freising, Bavaria. The brewery advertises itself as "The World's Oldest Brewery".

History

Establishment

Until the 1950s, the brewery described its date of foundation as the year 1146. At this time, a document allegedly dating to the year 1040 resurfaced. In it, Otto I, Bishop of Freising bestowed a brewing right upon the abbey. The document is generally dismissed as a forgery from the early 1600s. The first written record of the brewery dates to the year 1675. Another source, dating to 768, indicates the presence of a hops garden nearby.

State Brewery
In 1803, as part of a larger wave of German secularization, Weihenstephan Abbey was dissolved. The cloister passed into the ownership of the Bavarian government, where it was incorporated as the Königlich Bayerische Staatsbrauerei Weihenstephan (Royal Bavarian Brewery Weihenstephan). In 1921, the brewery adopted its current name. Today, although it is fully owned by the government of Bavaria, it is run as a modern enterprise in line with private sector practices. The grounds around the brewery were developed into a campus of the Hochschule Weihenstephan-Triesdorf.

Awards
 2016: Gold medal at the World Beer Cup, in the category South German-Style Hefeweizen, for Weihenstephaner Hefeweißbier.
 2016: Silver medal at the World Beer Cup, in the category German-Style Wheat Ale, for Weihenstephaner Kristallweißbier.

See also
 List of oldest companies

References

1040 establishments in Europe
1040s establishments in the Holy Roman Empire
Beer and breweries in Bavaria
Beer brands of Germany
Breweries in Germany
Pages translated from German Wikipedia
Buildings and structures in Freising (district)
Government-owned companies of Germany
Companies established in the 11th century